is a Japanese manga series by Gamoko Tsuyu. It was serialized in the  digital manga magazine B-Boy P! since September 2019. A live-action television drama adaptation was broadcast from April 22, 2022 to June 10, 2022 as the first entry for Drama Shower, a programming block created MBS in collaboration with Tunku, Kadokawa Corporation's label for live-action boys' love television dramas.

Plot

Having nothing but bad luck for all his life, college student Kōta Fukuhara maintains a pleasant demeanor on the outside to mask his frustrations with his misfortunes. After a run-in with his popular classmate, Naoya Shinomiya, Kōta learns that Naoya has nothing but good luck all his life, and just by being around him, he can minimize his bad luck. He proposes a friendship with Naoya, but Naoya misinterprets his words as a love confession and assumes they are dating.

Characters

Kōta is a college student who has experienced bad luck for all of his life. He masks his resentful personality with a good-natured demeanor.

Naoya is Kōta's classmate who has experienced good luck for all of his life. He is popular and good-looking.

Mugi is one of Naoya's friends who gets easily excited.

Gaku is one of Naoya's friends who has a cool appearance.

Media

Manga

Mr. Unlucky Has No Choice But to Kiss! is written and illustrated by Gamoko Tsuyu. It is serialized in the  digital manga magazine B-Boy P! since September 10, 2019. After its initial end in May 2020, Tsuyu resumed the manga to coincide with the April 2022 broadcast of the television drama adaptation. The chapters were later released in two bound volumes by Libre under the B-Boy P Comics imprint.

Television drama

On March 4, 2022, MBS and Tunku (a label of Kadokawa Corporation specializing in live-action boys' love television dramas) announced they were producing a live-action television drama adaptation of Mr. Unlucky Has No Choice But to Kiss! as their first entry for their collaboration programming block, Drama Shower. The series premiered on MBS on April 22, 2022 and ended on June 10, 2022. Simultaneous broadcasts also included TV Kanagawa, Chiba TV, TV Saitama, Tochigi TV, and Gunma TV.

The drama adaptation stars  as Kōta Fukuhara and LOL member  as Naoya Shinomiya.

Kaoru Azuma, the creator of Tunku, stated that, despite Mr. Unlucky Has No Choice But to Kiss! being published under a company outside of Kadokawa, she chose it as the first series to adapt. She stated that she had been keeping track of B-Boy P!, as the stories running in the magazine were accessible as entry point for newcomers to the boys' love genre. Azuma mentioned that because Mr. Unlucky Has No Choice But to Kiss! had a lot of comedic value, she had an idea of how she wanted Kōta to be portrayed and that she wanted Tunku's first entry to be a romantic comedy. Azuma stated that she focused on Kōta's two-faced personality as a "selling point" to casting the actor and that she had to make sure the rest of the actors looked "balanced" when they are together.

Reception

From September 2019 to May 2020, Mr. Unlucky Has No Choice But to Kiss! had at least 2.5 million pageviews. For the live-action television drama, Kaoru Azuma, the creator of Tunku, stated that it was popular among teenagers.

Notes

References

External links 

  

2019 manga
2022 Japanese television series debuts
2020s Japanese LGBT-related television series
Japanese boys' love television series
Japanese television dramas based on manga
Josei manga
Yaoi anime and manga